Emesopsis infenestra is a species of assassin bug.

Distribution
The species has been found in Australia, the Loyalty Islands and New Zealand.

References

Insects described in 2011
Terrestrial biota of New Zealand